The Mamaidev was a philosopher born in India in the 12th century. He was the son of Mataidev, who was the son of Lurangdev, who was the son of Dhani Matang Dev. He preached religion to the Meghwar community of Saurashtra, Kutch of Gujarat and Sindh, in present day Pakistan. He also preached to the poor Sinbhariya Meghwar for Dharma. He described and formulated  ancient Barmati Panth. His tomb is located in the Thatta District in the Sindh province of Pakistan.

He lived during the periods of Jadeja Samma rulers of Kutch and Samma rulers of Thatta. He composed hundreds of Bārmati Ginans in Sindhi, Kutchi and Halari languages and these sacred verses are called Māmai Dev jo Ginān. He died in Thatta and at the same place a shrine called Mamai Dev Astan was constructed. Every year, pilgrimage is done by devotees to this shrine to commemorate his death

References

11th-century Indian philosophers